Qaleh-ye Shian (also Romanized as Qal‘eh-ye Shīān and Qal‘eh-ye Sheyān; also known as Shīān and Shīyān) is a village in Shiyan Rural District, in the Central District of Eslamabad-e Gharb County, Kermanshah Province, Iran. At the 2006 census, its population was 2,252, in 514 families.

References 

Populated places in Eslamabad-e Gharb County